The Casio CA-53W is a digital calculator watch manufactured by the Japanese electronics company Casio and was introduced in 1988 as a successor to the CA-50. It became famous for the first time for it's appearance in the American science fiction films Back to the Future Part II (1989) and Back to the Future Part III (1990) and later for appearing in the American TV series Breaking Bad (2008-2013).

Specifications

Design 

The case of the watch measures 43.2 by 34.4 by 8.2 millimetres and the watch has a weight of 24 grams. The case has a lug-to-lug width of 42 millimetres and a thickness of 8 millimeters (including the raised area of the case back). The case of the watch is made from plastic along with the watch glass, with a stainless steel case back with the model and module number stamped on it which is secured with four screws. The inner lug width (where the strap attaches) is 20 millimeters, and the strap is made of polyurethane. The strap can be swapped or replaced.

Features 

The CA-53W features an 8-digit calculator with basic operators, a 24-hour  second stopwatch which can measure up to 23:59.99. The stop watch can also record split times and 1st and 2nd place times. Other features include a daily alarm, a full auto calendar up to the year 2099, an hourly signal and a dual time mode. The watch is claimed to be accurate to ±15 seconds per month and is powered by a CR2016 3-volt lithium button cell. The watch has basic water-resistance which commonly equates to a depth of 30 metres. The display of the watch lacks internal illumination.

Operation 

The watch is controlled by a keypad and two side mounted pushers. It has a 4x4 grid calculator keypad with rubber keys consisting of number keys from 0 to 9 along with a decimal place key in the first three columns and the operator keys in the last column. The key pad is marked with secondary functions and is also used for operating other functions of the watch such as operating the stopwatch, turning the alarm on and off and switching from am to pm in time setting mode. On the right side of the watch, there are two small stainless steel pushers with one recessed pusher used to adjust the watch while the other used to switch from mode to mode. The time is set by pressing the adjust pusher once and entering the values for the hours, minutes and seconds by using the keypad. Unlike any other value, the seconds can only be zeroed by pressing the "0" key on the keypad. Should this happen before 30 seconds, the watch will zero in at the beginning of the current minute. After 30 seconds it will advance the minutes by one minute. After adjustment of the time, the watch automatically goes to the date setting which can be cancelled by pressing the adjust pusher. Like the time, the date is also set by inputting values via the keypad. The button operation tones of the watch can be switched on and off by pressing the adjust pusher in the calculator mode.

The display of the watch shows hours, minutes, seconds and day of the week. The date can be viewed by pressing the division (÷) key on the keypad while in the main time mode. The date is shown in YY/MM/DD format. An "AM" sign on the display indicates morning hours and "PM" sign on the display indicates afternoon hours. The "AM" and "PM" indicators disappear when the watch is in 24-hour time keeping mode which is switched on by pressing the addition (+) key in the time setting mode. The alarm is indicated by vertical bars on the top left on the screen while the hourly signal is denoted by a bell icon adjacent to the alarm icon. The display also shows operators selected by the user in calculator mode when performing calculations.

In the stopwatch screen, the minutes, seconds and one-hundredths of a second are shown. The watch displays the elapsed hours when the key marked with the secondary function "ST-hour" on the keypad is pressed while in the stopwatch mode. Another feature of the stopwatch is the interval beep in which the watch beeps after every ten minutes elapsed in the stopwatch mode. However, this feature works in the stopwatch mode only.

Variants 
Since its introduction, the CA-53W was only available in a single version, CA-53W-1, sporting a regular LCD consisting of dark characters against a light background. This version has changed only slightly over the decades.

In early 2020, Casio introduced five new variants with the model name CA-53WF, each sporting a different color case and strap. These all feature an inverted LCD, showing light characters on a dark background.

In popular culture 

A common misconception about the CA-53W is that the watch was believed to have been worn by Marty McFly in Back to the Future, who in reality wore the Casio CA-50. He actually wore the CA-53W in the two sequels Back to the Future Part II and Back to the Future Part III. 

The watch was also seen throughout the American TV series Breaking Bad, in which it is worn by the main protagonist, Walter White. 

The CA-53W was worn by Rowan Atkinson in most episodes of Mr. Bean.

This watch also may have been worn by Moss in the popular British sitcom IT Crowd.

One of the main characters of The Big Bang Theory TV series, Raj Koothrappali, also wore a black Casio CA-53W during the first five seasons of the show.

The watch was also worn by the Joker in The Dark Knight, as well as Mike Wheeler in Stranger Things.

This watch was also seen to be worn by Hughie Campbell in the third season of The Boys (TV series).

See also
Calculator watch

References 

Casio watches
Products introduced in 1988
1980s fashion
Consumer electronics